Cirsium repandum is a North American species of plants in the tribe Cardueae within the family Asteraceae. Common names include sand-hill thistle and coastal-plain thistle. The species is native to the south-eastern United States, the coastal plain in Virginia, Georgia, and the Carolinas.

Cirsium repandum is a biennial or perennial herb up to 80 cm (32 inches) tall. Leaves have small, narrow spines along the edges. Flower heads are sometimes produced one at a time, sometimes in small groups, each head with light purple disc florets but no ray florets. The species grows in sandy soils on sand hills or in pine barrens.

References

repandum
Flora of the Southeastern United States
Plants described in 1803
Flora without expected TNC conservation status